"Everyday Now" is an EP released by the Scottish band Texas released in 1989. The EP was released through Mercury Records and included three studio tracks and three live tracks. In the UK, it was released as a special edition 12" single, limited to 5000 copies.

Track listing
All tracks written by McElhone and Spiteri.

Studio
 "Everyday Now" - 4:39
 "Believe Me" - 4:00
 "All in Vain" - 3:46

Live
 "Everyday Now" - 4:39
 "Believe Me" - 4:00
 "All in Vain" - 3:46

Note
Tracks 4 to 6 recorded live at the Paradiso, Amsterdam, June 1989 by KRO Radio.

References

Texas (band) albums
1989 debut EPs